"Yawa No Dey End" (English: "Problem Never Ends") is a song by Nigerian singer-songwriter Majeeed, on his debut extended play Bitter Sweet. It is the third song on the EP, released officially on 25 March 2022 by Dream Empire Music, through Dvpper Music. A new version of the song featuring Joeboy, was released by Dream Empire Music, and licensed through Mr Eazi's emPawa Africa.

Background
After signing a record deal with Dream Empire Music in 2021, The following year, he released "Yawa No Dey End" on 	25 February 2022, as the lead, single off his debut extended play Bitter Sweet, released on 25 March 2022, through Dream Empire Music. "Yawa No Dey End" was produced by Shugabeatz. On 15 April 2022, he performed an acapella version on his YouTube channel. On 25 March 2022, a new version, with Joeboy was released by Dream Empire Music, and licensed through Mr Eazi's emPawa Africa imprint.

Commercial performance
In review for GrungeCake, Richardine Bartee said "He casually sings about what might kill him, like his responsibilities as a provider, his mother’s financial needs, and still trying to find time to protect and care for himself". On 16 April 2022, "Yawa No They End", was the lead song on Pulse Nigeria Future Sounds Vol.3. "Yawa No Dey End" shortlisted on The Native's songs of the day, on 29 April 2022.  Chibuzo Emmanuel, who reviewed the song for the list, praised the song, and said "Yawa No Dey End is a beautiful mid-tempo highlife-inf lected Afropop record". As of May 2022, "Yawa No Dey End (Remix)" has received 299 thousand streams on Boomplay.

On 9 May 2022, "Yawa No Dey End (Remix)", featuring Joeboy, debuted at 41 on TurnTable Top 50 chart. On 10 May 2022, "Yawa No Dey End (Remix)" debuted on Turntable Top 50 Airplay Chart at number 18. Same day, "Yawa No Dey End (Remix)" debuted on TurnTable TV Top songs at number 43. As of May 2022, "Yawa No Dey End" has received 570 thousand streams on Audiomack. On 11 July 2022, it debuted on the newly launched TurnTable Top 100, an expansion of the Top 50 chart, at number 59. On 13 July 2022, following the initial launch of the TurnTable Nigeria Top Afro-Pop Songs chart, "Yawa No Dey End" debuted at number 30.

On 13 July 2022, it debuted on the newly launched TurnTable Top TV Songs, an expansion of the TV Top songs, at number 73, and  debuted on the newly launched TurnTable Top Radio Songs, an expansion of the Top 50 Airplay, at number 31.

Music video
The music video for "Yawa No Dey End" was directed by Kemz, and was released on 25 February 2022. As of April 2022, it has received 1.2 million views on YouTube. The music video for "Yawa No Dey End (Remix)" with Joeboy  was directed by Kemz, and was released on 29 April 2022. As of May 2022, it has received 100 thousand views on YouTube.

Version
 2022: "Yawa No Dey End" - 2:25
 2022: "Yawa No Dey End" (with. Joeboy) – 2:26

Charts

Release history

References 

2022 singles
Pop songs
2022 songs